Anopinella isodelta is a species of moth of the family Tortricidae. It is endemic to Colombia.

The length of the fore wings is 8.2-9.3 mm.

External links
Systematic revision of Anopinella Powell (Lepidoptera: Tortricidae: Euliini) and phylogenetic analysis of the Apolychrosis group of genera

Anopinella
Moths of South America
Moths described in 1912